The Collection is a compilation album from Scottish singer-songwriter Donovan. It was released in the United Kingdom (Castle Communications CCSCD 276) in December 1990 and in the United States on 1 July 1992.

History
In 1990, Castle Communications released a Donovan compilation that spanned both his 1965 Pye Records recordings and his subsequent work for Epic Records.  The album marked the first appearance of many of the tracks on compact disc.

Track listing
All tracks by Donovan Leitch.

"Catch the Wind" – 2:54
"Colours" – 2:43
"To Try for the Sun" – 3:36
"The Summer Day Reflection Song" – 2:11
"Turquoise" – 3:28
"The Trip" – 4:33
"Sunshine Superman" – 3:13
"Ferris Wheel" – 4:12
"Hey Gyp (Dig the Slowness)" – 3:09
"Museum" – 2:53
"Sunny South Kensington" – 3:48
"Hurdy Gurdy Man" – 3:12
"The Fat Angel" – 3:17
"Hi It's Been a Long Time" – 2:35
"Where Is She" – 2:44
"Changes" – 2:54
"Appearances" – 3:40
"Cosmic Wheels" – 4:01
"Lord of the Reedy River" – 2:34
"I Like You" – 5:16
"Song for John" – 2:18
"There Is an Ocean" – 4:48

References

External links
 The Collection – Donovan Unofficial Site

Albums produced by Mickie Most
1990 compilation albums
Donovan compilation albums